Flemming Christensen (born 10 April 1958) is a Danish former football (soccer) player and manager.

Career
In his active career, Christensen played for Danish clubs AB and Lyngby BK, as well as French club AS Saint-Etienne and FC Aarau from Switzerland. He debuted for the Danish national team in 1982, and he played a total of 11 national team matches and scored 2 goals. He was selected to represent Denmark at the 1986 World Cup, but did not play any matches.

After ending his active career, he became a football manager, and among other teams managed Slagelse B&I, Næstved BK, AB, and ÍF Fuglafjørður.

Honours
Lyngby
 Danish championship: 1983 and 1992
 Danish Cup: 1984, 1985 and 1990

Individual
 Effodeildin Best Coach: 2012

References

External links
Danish national team profile 

1958 births
Living people
Danish men's footballers
Denmark international footballers
Akademisk Boldklub players
Lyngby Boldklub players
AS Saint-Étienne players
FC Aarau players
Ligue 1 players
Danish Superliga players
Danish expatriate men's footballers
Danish expatriate sportspeople in Switzerland
Danish expatriate sportspeople in France
Expatriate footballers in Switzerland
Expatriate footballers in France
1986 FIFA World Cup players
Danish football managers
Akademisk Boldklub managers
Næstved Boldklub managers
Expatriate football managers in Norway
Association football forwards
Danish 1st Division managers
Footballers from Copenhagen